Lintneria justiciae is a moth of the  family Sphingidae. It is known from south-eastern Brazil, eastern Argentina and Uruguay.

There are orange-yellow transverse median lines on the abdomen upperside. Adults have been recorded in late January in Brazil.

The larvae have been recorded feeding on Justicia, Petunia and Hyptis sidifolia.

References

Lintneria
Moths described in 1856